Mobina Alinasab (born 7 August 2000), is an Iranian chess player who holds the title of Woman International Master.

Biography
In 2016, Mobina Alinasab won Asian Youth Chess Championship and won 2nd place in World Youth Chess Championship in girls U16 age group.

In 2017, Mobina Alinasab won Iranian Women's Chess Championship. In 2017, she won Women's World Chess Championship Asian Zonal 3.1 tournament, and qualified for the Women's World Chess Championship 2018.

Mobina Alinasab played for Iran in the Women's Chess Olympiads:
 In 2018, at third board in the 43rd Chess Olympiad (women) in Batumi (+6 =4 -1).

In 2017, she was awarded the FIDE Woman International Master (WIM) title.

References

External links

2000 births
Living people
Iranian female chess players
Chess Woman International Masters